Éric Saul (born 26 May 1954) is a French former Grand Prix motorcycle road racer.

Career 
Saul began motorcycle competition in 1973. That year he entered the last round of the "coupe des 4 saisons" challenge in Magny Cours on an unmodified Yamaha 125 AS3 and finished 15th. His result convinced him to pursue a racing career. In 1974, he started with the "coupe des 4 saisons" challenge and won both rounds in the 125cc class on a Yamaha AS3 and in the 500cc class on Kawasaki even though it was his first time on the Croix-en-Thernois circuit. Also in 1974, he competed in the Kawasaki Cup Challenge and finished 11th.

Saul competed in the Grand Prix world championship from 1977 to 1983 and then returned to compete in 1986. His best result was a fourth-place finish in the 1982 350cc world championship. Saul won two Grand Prix races during his career at the 1981 250cc Nations Grand Prix and the 1982 350cc Austrian Grand Prix.

After his racing career ended, Saul created the International Classic Grand Prix organization promoting meetings of classic Grand Prix bikes and racers from the 1970s and 1980s.

Results 
Kawasaki Cup

Grand Prix career statistics

Points system from 1969 to 1987:

(key) (Races in bold indicate pole position; races in italics indicate fastest lap)

References

External links 
Eric Saul career statistics at MotoGP.com
International Classic Grand Prix

External videos 

1954 births
Living people
French motorcycle racers
125cc World Championship riders
250cc World Championship riders
350cc World Championship riders